Clown in the Mirror is the second studio album released by Danish progressive metal band Royal Hunt. The album was re-released in 2020 on Vinyl featuring a separate lyrics sheet and a die cut album cover.

Track listing
All songs written by André Andersen.
 "Intro/Wasted Time" – 5:41
 "Ten to Life" – 3:41
 "On the Run" – 3:16
 "Clown in the Mirror" – 4:37
 "Third Stage" (Instrumental) – 1:42
 "Bodyguard" – 4:13
 "Legion of the Damned" – 5:00
 "Here Today, Gone Tomorrow" – 4:12
 "Bad Blood" – 3:58
 "Epilogue" – 6:01
 "Age Gone Wild" (Acoustic version) – 4:03
 "Kingdom Dark" (Acoustic version) – 3:05
 "Bad Luck" – 3:16
Tracks 11-13 omitted on the European release (Rondel Records RRCD 9009)
Tracks 11-13 originally on The Maxi EP
Rondel Records version, "Intro" and "Wasted Time" are 2 split tracks

Personnel
André Andersen – keyboards and rhythm guitar 
Henrik Brockmann – lead and backing vocals
Steen Mogensen – bass guitar
Jacob Kjaer – lead guitar
Kenneth Olsen – drums
with
Maria McTurk – backing vocals
Lise Hansen – backing vocals

Production
Recorded at Mirand Studio, Media Sound Productions, Copenhagen and House Of Music, New Jersey, USA
Mixed at House Of Music, New Jersey, USA by Royal Hunt and Nelson Ayers
Mastered at Sterling Sound, NY by George Marino
Art direction and Illustration by Peter Brander

References

External links
Heavy Harmonies page

Royal Hunt albums
1994 albums